The Alcove  (Italian: L'alcova; also known as Lust), is a 1985 Italian erotic film directed by Joe D'Amato.

The film contains brief hardcore sex footage on a vintage film reel that the film's characters watch. Otherwise, it is a softcore film.

Plot
It is the year 1936, Italy is in a state of euphoria because of its new African empire. A war veteran returns home from the Second Abyssinian War bringing back a black woman. This situation breaks the monotony and unravels the secret turbulent life of his family.

Cast

 Lilli Carati as Alessandra
 Annie Belle as Velma
 Laura Gemser as Zerbal
 Al Cliver as Elio
 Roberto Caruso as Furio
 Nello Pazzafini as The Gardener

Release
The film grossed 335,890,000 L.(US$175,950 - ) on its release.

See also
 List of Italian films of 1985

Notes

External links
 

Films directed by Joe D'Amato
Films scored by Manuel De Sica
1985 films
Italian erotic drama films
1980s erotic drama films
1985 drama films
1980s Italian films